Litava is a village and municipality in the Krupina District of the Banská Bystrica Region of Slovakia.

History
The village was mentioned for the first time in a document from 1135. Already in this year a Romanesque chapel was present in the village. With the presence of this church, the village served as a kind of spiritual, cultural and social center of the region since the 12th century. In the 15th century Litava was a tolling point. In 1496 already the village had its own mill. In 1613 a wooden school stood in the middle of the village which was rebuilt into a brick school in 1811.

References

External links
 

Villages and municipalities in Krupina District